A Little Like Drowning is a 1978 film directed by Anthony Minghella. The first film he directed, this 55-minute feature was shot on the Isle of Wight in 1977 and completed in 15 days.

Credits
 Director: Anthony Minghella
 Production Company: The Silver Screen Film Company
 Producer: Michael Maloney
 Associate Producer: Pamela Burns 
 Screenplay: Anthony Minghella
 Cinematographer: Michael Maloney
 Art Director: Lee Elliott 
 Film editor: Barry Reynolds

Cast
 Ann Gow as Leonora
 David Hatton as Alfredo
 Rosy Clayton as Theresa
 Carole Reed as Amelia
 Anita Belli as Gioia
 David Pugh as Victorio
 Anthony Minghella as Eduardo
 Antonietta Bell as  Commara Theresa
 Penny Cartwright as child Leonora
 Dominic Minghella as Martino
 Mary Baker as Mabel
 Harry Chivers as Man in cafe
 George Croudass as Robert
 Lee Elliott as Bridegroom
 Denis Frank as Sandwichman
 David Guthrie as Father David
 Fiona Kelly as Waitress
 Sheila McAnulty as Woman in cafe
 Gareth Pritchard as Father Benedict
 Brian Small as Washer-up
 Elizabeth Verrecchia as Accordionist
 Heather Williams as Julia Jarrett

External links
BFI Film & TV Database
 

1978 films
Films directed by Anthony Minghella
1978 directorial debut films
1970s English-language films